The Dreamworld Tower, is a  tower located in the Dreamworld theme park on the Gold Coast, Queensland, Australia. The Giant Drop and the former Tower of Terror II uses this tower.

Tower design
The tower was designed and manufactured by Intamin, an amusement ride manufacturer. Construction costs of the tower alone exceeded A$1 million. It was the first tower and only of its kind to feature more than one amusement ride. The interior of the tower features a staircase to the top which allows crews to maintain the tower and rides.

Rides

The Giant Drop

Riders start up the tower at a leisurely pace and are held suspended in the air for roughly 40 seconds before plummeting towards the ground.

Tower of Terror II

The Tower of Terror II was the world's fourth tallest roller coaster. It was the fifth fastest roller coaster, tying with the Superman: Escape from Krypton roller coaster at Six Flags Magic Mountain for speed. It opened on 23 January 1997 as the tallest and fastest roller coaster in the world. The ride was closed permanently on 3 November 2019.

Viewing from other locations
The Dreamworld Tower is able to be viewed with the naked eye from Coochiemudlo Island in Moreton Bay, providing the atmospheric condition allows for this. The closer sugar mill exhaust tower near Jacobs' Well is not to be confused with the viewing of the tower and appears to be the same height. This chimney appears to the left of the Dreamworld Tower when viewing from main beach.

See also

 Tower of Terror II
 List of roller coaster rankings

References

Amusement rides introduced in 1997
Towers in Australia
Dreamworld (Australia)
Towers completed in 1997